Ayub Timbe Masika (born 10 September 1992 in Nairobi) is a Kenyan professional footballer who currently plays as a winger or a forward for Kenya national team.

Club career

Early career
Masika was born on 10 September 1992 in Pumwani, an estate in Nairobi, Kenya.

He moved through several academies in Kenya, including that of Ligi Ndogo, before moving to the Anderlecht Academy from the JMJ Youth Academy in 2006 at the age of 13, where he stayed for two years before moving to the Beerschot A.C. (then Germinal Beerschot) academy in 2008.

Genk
In May 2010, Masika signed a 2-year deal with Genk from Germinal Beerschot. He played for the club's reserve team until he signed a new 4-year contract with the club in June 2011. He made his debut for the club when he came on in the 82nd minute for Nadson in a 1–1 draw against Zulte Waregem on 15 January 2012. He got his first assist for the club on his second appearance during their 5–0 win over Oud-Heverlee Leuven on 29 January 2012 when he delivered the ball to Christian Benteke for the fifth goal of the match. He scored his first goal for Genk in their 2–0 UEFA Europa League play-off round win against Swiss opponents FC Luzern, in the 88th minute, on 30 August 2012 at the Cristal Arena.

Lierse
On 1 September 2014, Masika was loaned Lierse from Genk for 2 seasons, with an option to buy at the end of the loan. He made his debut for the side in a 2–2 draw in the league against Anderlecht on 13 September, coming on in the 68th minute for Wanderson. He scored his first goal for the club on 24 September, opening the score in a 4–0 Belgian Cup win over Sint-Truiden.

In July 2016, Lierse signed Timbe on a permanent three-year deal.

Beijing Renhe
Masika joined China League One side Beijing Renhe in February 2017. He scored eight goals in his first season to help win promotion to the Chinese Super League. The following season, he was loaned back to the second tier to play for Heilongjiang Lava Spring, though he also scored seven goals in 14 games in the top flight for Beijing Renhe. On 31 January 2020 – transfer deadline day in England – Masika joined EFL Championship side Reading on loan until the end of the season.

International career
Masika was meant to play in a 2013 Africa Cup of Nations preliminary round match against Togo on 29 February 2012, but could not fly back to Kenya as he had club commitments with Genk that day. However, he made his international debut for Kenya against South Africa on 16 October 2012, coming on as a substitute for Thika United forward Francis Kahata in the 61st minute. Kenya lost the match 2–1.

Masika was called up to the Kenya national team once again for a friendly against Libya to be played on 6 February 2013, but refused to play, claiming that the Football Kenya Federation owed him money from his last appearance for the team against Tanzania. He made his return to the side on 18 May 2014, starting and playing the full 90 minutes in a 2015 Africa Cup of Nations qualification match against Comoros. Masika scored his first goal for the national team 12 days later in the second leg, scoring a free kick to secure a 2–1 aggregate win for the Harambee Stars and a second round match-up against Lesotho.

Career statistics

Club

International

International goals
Scores and results list Kenya's goal tally first.

Honours
Genk
 Belgian Cup: 2012–13
Buriram United
 Thai League 1 : 2021–22
 Thai FA Cup: 2021–22
 Thai League Cup: 2021–22

References

External links
 
 soka.co.ke
 fostats.com
 
 
 

1992 births
Living people
Sportspeople from Nairobi
Kenyan footballers
Association football forwards
Ligi Ndogo S.C. players
R.S.C. Anderlecht players
Beerschot A.C. players
K.R.C. Genk players
Lierse S.K. players
Beijing Renhe F.C. players
Heilongjiang Ice City F.C. players
Reading F.C. players
Vissel Kobe players
Ayub Masika
Belgian Pro League players
Challenger Pro League players
China League One players
Chinese Super League players
Kenya international footballers
Kenyan expatriate footballers
Expatriate footballers in Belgium
Expatriate footballers in China
Expatriate footballers in England
2019 Africa Cup of Nations players